The canton of Algrange is an administrative division of the Moselle department, northeastern France. Its borders were modified at the French canton reorganisation which came into effect in March 2015. Its seat is in Algrange.

It consists of the following communes:
 
Algrange
Angevillers
Audun-le-Tiche
Aumetz
Boulange
Fontoy
Havange
Knutange
Lommerange
Neufchef
Nilvange
Ottange
Rédange
Rochonvillers
Russange
Tressange

References

Cantons of Moselle (department)